The 1909 United States Senate special election in Pennsylvania was held on March 16, 1909. George T. Oliver was elected by the Pennsylvania General Assembly to the United States Senate.

Background
Republican Philander C. Knox was appointed to the United States Senate in June 1904 after the death of Matthew Quay. Knox was subsequently elected to a full term in the Senate by the Pennsylvania General Assembly, consisting of the House of Representatives and the Senate, in January 1905. Knox served in the U.S. Senate until his resignation on March 4, 1909, to become United States Secretary of State in the William Howard Taft administration, leaving the seat vacant until a successor was elected.

Results
Following the resignation of Sen. Philander C. Knox, the Pennsylvania General Assembly convened on March 16, 1909, to elect a new Senator to fill the vacancy. The results of the vote of both houses combined are as follows:

|-
|-bgcolor="#EEEEEE"
| colspan="3" align="right" | Totals
| align="right" | 257
| align="right" | 100.00%
|}

See also 
 1908 and 1909 United States Senate elections

References

External links
Pennsylvania Election Statistics: 1682-2006 from the Wilkes University Election Statistics Project

1909 special
Pennsylvania 1909
Pennsylvania special
United States Senate special
United States Senate 1909
Pennsylvania 1909